Lawrence Norman (born April 5, 1966) is a Canadian slalom canoeist who competed from the late 1980s to the late 1990s. Competing in two Summer Olympics, he earned his best finish of 18th in the C-1 event in Atlanta in 1996.

References
Sports-reference.com profile

1966 births
Canoeists from Toronto
Canadian male canoeists
Canoeists at the 1992 Summer Olympics
Canoeists at the 1996 Summer Olympics
Living people
Olympic canoeists of Canada